Written vernacular Chinese, also known as Baihua or Huawen, is the forms of written Chinese based on the varieties of Chinese spoken throughout China, in contrast to Classical Chinese, the written standard used during imperial China up to the early twentieth century. A written vernacular based on Mandarin Chinese was used in novels in the Ming and Qing dynasties (14th–20th centuries), and later refined by intellectuals associated with the May Fourth Movement. Since the early 1920s, this modern vernacular form has been the standard style of writing for speakers of all varieties of Chinese throughout mainland China, Taiwan, Malaysia, and Singapore as the written form of Modern Standard Chinese. This is commonly called Standard Written Chinese or Modern Written Chinese to avoid ambiguity with spoken vernaculars, with the written vernaculars of earlier eras, and with other written vernaculars such as written Cantonese or written Hokkien.

History
During the Zhou dynasty (1046–256 BC), Old Chinese was the spoken and written form of Chinese, and was used to write classical Chinese texts. Starting from the Qin (221 BC), however, spoken Chinese began to evolve faster than written. The difference grew larger with the passage of time. By the time of the Tang and Song dynasties (618–1279), people began to write in their vernacular dialects in the form of biànwén and yǔlù, and the spoken language was completely distinct from the still-maintained written standard of classical Chinese (wenyanwen). The majority of the population, not educated in classical Chinese, could understand very little of written or printed texts. During the Ming and Qing (1368–1912), vernacular language began to be used in novels, but formal writing continued to use classical Chinese.

Lower Yangtze Mandarin formed the standard for written vernacular Chinese until it was displaced by the Beijing dialect in the late Qing. This Baihua was used by writers all over China regardless of the dialect they spoke. Chinese writers who spoke other dialects had to use the grammar and vocabulary of Lower Yangtze and Beijing Mandarin to make their writing understandable to the majority of Chinese. After the May Fourth Movement, baihuawen became the normal written form of Chinese. While the phonology of Modern Standard Chinese is based on that of Beijing, its grammar is officially based on the exemplary works of vernacular literature, which excludes certain colloquial or 'extreme' forms while incorporating some constructions from Classical Chinese (see below). Similarly, the vocabulary of Written Vernacular Chinese discards the majority of slang terms from the Beijing dialect while absorbing some literary and/or archaic words from Classical Chinese, as well as foreign loanwords and a small number of regionalisms from other major dialect groups.

Literature in vernacular Mandarin and the modern written language

Jin Shengtan, who edited several novels in vernacular Chinese in the 17th century, is widely regarded as the pioneer of literature in the vernacular style. However, it was not until after the May Fourth Movement in 1919 and the promotion by scholars and intellectuals such as pragmatist reformer Hu Shih, pioneering writer Chen Hengzhe, leftist Lu Xun, Chen Duxiu, and leftist Qian Xuantong that vernacular Chinese, or Bai hua, gained widespread importance. In particular, The True Story of Ah Q by Lu Xun is generally accepted as the first modern work to fully utilize the vernacular language.

Classical Chinese became increasingly viewed by the progressive forces as hindering education and literacy, and, many suggested, social and national progress. The works of Lu Xun and other writers of fiction and nonfiction did much to advance this view. Vernacular Chinese soon came to be viewed as mainstream by most people. Along with the growing popularity of vernacular writing in books in this period was the acceptance of punctuation, modeled after that used in Western languages (traditional Chinese literature was almost entirely unpunctuated), and the use of Arabic numerals. Following the 1911 Revolution, successive governments continuously carried out a progressive and national education system to include primary and secondary education. All the curriculum was in vernacular Chinese. Prolific writers such as Lu Xun and Bing Xin published very popular works often in important literary journals of the day, the journals published essays and reviews providing the theoretical background for the vernacular writings. For example, Lu Xun's "Diary of a Madman" elicited spirited debate in the journals of the time. Systematic education, talented authors and an active scholastic community closely affiliated with the education system all contributed to the establishment of the contemporary vernacular written language within a short time.

Since the late 1920s, nearly all Chinese newspapers, books, and official and legal documents have been written in vernacular Chinese using the national standard. However, the tone or register and the choice of vocabulary may have been formal or informal, depending on the context. Generally, the more formal the register of vernacular Chinese, the greater the resemblance to classical Chinese; modern writing lies on a continuum between the two. Since the transition, it has been, however, extremely rare for a text to be written predominantly in classical Chinese. Until the 1970s, the legal code of the Republic of China was written in classical Chinese, though in a form replete with modern expressions and constructions that would have been foreign to ancient writers. Similarly, until the end of the 20th century, men of letters, especially in the Republic of China (Taiwan), exchanged personal letters (known as 尺牘) using Classical Chinese stock phrases for openings, greetings, and closings, and using vernacular Chinese (albeit heavily influenced by the classical language) for the body. Nevertheless, only well-educated individuals in modern times have full reading comprehension of classical texts, and very few are able to write proficiently in classical Chinese. Presently, the ability to read some classical Chinese is taught throughout mainland China in simplified characters; while in Taiwan, Hong Kong, and Macau, traditional characters are used as part of compulsory primary and secondary education, with the reading of Tang poetry taught starting from elementary school and classical prose taught throughout lower and upper secondary schools. 

Though it is rare to encounter fully classical texts in modern times, it is just as rare to see text of a considerable length only employ colloquial Chinese resources and exclude all classical constructions and lexical items. Despite initial intentions on the part of reformers to create a written language that closely mirrors the colloquial Mandarin dialects and to expunge classical influences from the language for the sake of modernization, it became clear to users of the new written standard that the admixture of a certain proportion of classical (wenyanwen) grammatical constructions and vocabulary into baihuawen was unavoidable and serves as an important means of conveying tone and register. Thus, for the vernacular language used in official settings like academic and literary works or government communications (e.g. academic papers, formal essays, textbooks, political speeches, legal codes, state-media news, etc.), a small number of stock classical constructions (around 300 patterns) and vocabulary items (around 250 expressions) continue to be employed and are subject to additional related requirements relating to classical prosody and parallelism. The use of these structures is a characteristic of formal registers of baihuawen (termed 書面漢語, 'Formal Written Chinese', lit. 'book surface Chinese') and distinguishes the formal modern language from conversational baihuawen on the one hand and fully classical wenyanwen on the other hand. Though clearly dependent on context and on the personal preferences of the author, analyses of typical 20th century essays and speeches have yielded a ratio of formal to informal expressions of around 2:3 (i.e., ~40% of the texts consist of formal expressions). Even in informal personal communications otherwise composed entirely in the vernacular, classical words and usages may still appear every so often. In particular, chengyu (成語), four-character classical idioms, are used by writers and speakers of all education levels in a variety of contexts.

Literature in other Chinese varieties

There is also a modest body of literature for Cantonese, Shanghainese, and Taiwanese Hokkien, which include additional characters for writing the language as spoken. Efforts to standardize the written forms of these languages include the Taiwanese Southern Min Recommended Characters lists in the case of Taiwanese. They are most commonly used in commercial advertisements, song lyrics sung in local varieties, and court records of dialogue and colloquial expressions. They are often mixed to varying degrees with Classical Chinese and Modern Standard Chinese.

See also

 Chinese literature
 Chinese poetry

References

Chinese language